

National Anchors/Hosts
Dawna Friesen – Global National
Farah Nasser – Global National
Mercedes Stephenson – The West Block
Carolyn Jarvis – Senior Investigative Correspondent
David Akin - chief political correspondent
Cheryl Hickey – Entertainment Tonight Canada
Jeff McArthur - The Morning Show
Carolyn MacKenzie - The Morning Show

Global BC

Anchors
Paul Haysom - Global News Morning
Sonia Sunger - Global News Morning
Coleen Christie - Global News at Noon
Chris Gailus - Global News Hour at 6
Sophie Lui - Global News Hour at 6 and Global News at 5
Anne Drewa - Consumer Matters on the News Hour
Jordan Armstrong - Global News at 11
Jennifer Palma - Global News Morning and Global News at Noon - weekend
Sarah MacDonald - Global News Hour at 6, Global News at 11 - weekend
Katelin Owsianski - Global News Morning - traffic

Weather
Mark Madryga - Chief Meteorologist 
Kristi Gordon - Senior Meteorologist
Yvonne Schalle - Meteorologist

Sports
Squire Barnes - Sports Director
Jay Durant
Jay Janower
Barry Deley

Global Okanagan

Anchors
Doris Maria Bregolisse - Global News at 6:30 and Global News at 11
Kimberly Davidson - Global News at 5:30 and Global News at 6:30 - weekend

Global Edmonton

Anchors
Jennifer Crosby - Global News Morning and Global News at Noon
Vanesh Pratap - Global News Morning and Global News at Noon
Gord Steinke - Global News at 5 and Global News Hour at 6
Carole Anne Devaney - Global News Hour at 6
Nancy Carlson - Global News at 11 and Global News Hour at 6
Quinn Ohler - Global News Hour at 6 and Global News at 11 - weekend
Daintre Christensen - Global News Morning - traffic

Weather
Jesse Beyer - Chief Meteorologist
Mike Sobel - Weather Specialist
Phil Darlington - Weather Specialist
Kevin O'Connell - Weather Specialist

Sports
Kevin Karius - Sports Director
John Sexsmith
Quinn Phillips
Jack Haskin

Global Calgary

Anchors
Dallas Flexhaug - Global News Morning and Global News at Noon
Linda Olsen - Global News at 5 and Global News Hour at 6
Bindu Suri - Global News Morning - Weekend
Joel Senick- Global News Morning - Weekend
Jayme Doll - Global News Hour at 6 and Global News at 11 - weekend
Leslie Horton - Global News Morning - traffic

Weather
Paul Dunphy - Chief Weather Anchor
Jodi Hughes - Weather Anchor
Tiffany Lizee - Chief Meteorologist
Danielle Savoni - Meterorologist
Deb Matejick - Weather Anchor

Sports

 Moses Woldu

 Kami Kepke

Global Lethbridge

Anchors
Liam Nixon - Global News at 5, Global News at 6 and Global News at 11

Weather
Paul Dunphy - Global Calgary

Global Saskatoon

Anchors
Marney Blunt - Global News at 5
Blake Lough - Global News at 6 (*Regina)
Antony Robart - Global News at 10 (*Toronto)
Crystal Goomansingh - Global News at 10 (*Toronto)
Angie Seth - Global News at 6 and Global News at 10 - weekend (*Toronto)

Weather
Peter Quinlan - Chief Meteorologist
Mike Arsenault - Weather Specialist
Tiffany Lizée - Meteorologist - Regina 
Ross Hull - Meteorologist

Sports
Anthony Bruno
Asa Rehman
Megan Robinson

Global Regina

Anchors
Teri Fikowski - Global News Morning
Marney Blunt - Global News at 5
Whitney Stinson - Global News at 6 and Global News at Noon
Blake Lough - Focus Saskatchewan
Antony Robart - Global News at 10
Crystal Goomansingh - Global News at 10
Angie Seth - Global News at 6 and Global News at 10 - weekend

Weather
Tiffany Lizée - Chief Meteorologist
Mike Arsenault - Weather Specialist
Ross Hull - Meteorologist

Sports
Taylor Shire - Sports Director
Anthony Bruno
Asa Rehman
Megan Robinson

Global Winnipeg

Anchors
Shannon Cuciz - Global News Morning
Heather Steele - Global News at 6
Lauren McNabb - Global News at 6
Brittany Greenslade - Focus Manitoba
Antony Robart - Global News at 10
Crystal Goomansingh - Global News at 10
Angie Seth - Global News at 6 and Global News at 10 - weekend

Weather
Mike Koncan - Chief Weather Anchor
Adriana Zhang - Weather Specialist
Ross Hull - Meteorologist
Mike Arsenault - Weather Specialist

Sports
Russ Hubson
Anthony Bruno
Asa Rehman
Megan Robinson

Global Toronto

Anchors
Antony Robart - Global News Morning
Candice Daniel - Global News Morning and Global News at Noon
Alan Carter - Global News at 5:30 and Focus Ontario
Tracy Tong - Global News at 11
Mark Carcasole - Global News at 6 and Global News at 11 - weekend

Weather
Liem Vu - Weather Specialist
Anthony Farnell - Chief Meteorologist
Ross Hull - Meteorologist
Mike Arsenault - Weather Specialist
Carla Bosacki - Weather Specialist

Sports
Rob Leth - Sports Director
Anthony Bruno
Asa Rehman
Megan Robinson

Global Montreal

Anchors
Laura Casella - Global News Morning
Candice Daniel - Global News at noon
Tracy Tong - Global News at 5:30, Global News at 6:30 and Global News at 11
Mark Carcasole - Global News at 6 and Global News at 11 - weekend

Weather
Kim Sullivan - Weather Specialist
Anthony Farnell - Chief Meteorologist
Mike Arsenault - Weather Specialist
Ross Hull - Meteorologist

Sports
Anthony Bruno
Rob Leth
Asa Rehman
Megan Robinson

Global New Brunswick

Anchors
Ron Kronstein - Global News at 6
Andrea Dion - Global News Morning
Paul Brothers - Global News Morning
Crystal Goomansingh - Global News at 11
Antony Robart - Global News at 11
Angie Seth - Global News at 6 and Global News at 11 - weekend

Weather
Anthony Farnell
Mike Arsenault
Ross Hull

Sports
Rob Leth
Anthony Bruno
Megan Robinson
Asa Rehman

Global Halifax

Anchors
Ron Kronstein - Global News at 6
Andrea Dion - Global News Morning
Paul Brothers - Global News Morning
Crystal Goomansingh - Global News at 11
Antony Robart - Global News at 11
Angie Seth - Global News at 6 and Global News at 11 - weekend

Weather
Anthony Farnell
Mike Arsenault
Ross Hull

Sports
Rob Leth
Anthony Bruno
Megan Robinson
Asa Rehman

External links

Global National correspondents
Global BC personalities
Global Okanagan Personalities
Global Edmonton personalities
Global Calgary personalities
Global Lethbridge personalities
Global Saskatoon personalities
Global Regina personalities
Global Winnipeg personalities
Global Toronto personalities
Global Montreal personalities
Global New Brunswick personalities
Global Halifax personalities

Reference